Tall-e Sorkh (also known as Tall-e Sorkh-e Jadīd) is a village in Ramjerd-e Do Rural District, Dorudzan District, Marvdasht County, Fars Province, Iran. At the 2006 census, its population was 441, in 102 families.

References 

Populated places in Marvdasht County